Badoor  is a village in Kasaragod district in the state of Kerala, India.

Demographics
 India census, Badoor had a population of 5296 with 2598 males and 2698 females.

See also

Perla
Kattathadka
Kumbla

References

Suburbs of Kasaragod